The 2014 Carlisle City Council election took place on 22 May 2014 to elect members of Carlisle District Council in Cumbria, England. One third of the council was up for election and the Labour Party stayed in overall control of the council.

After the election, the composition of the council was:
Labour 29
Conservative 19
Liberal Democrats 2
Independent 2

Background
17 seats were contested in 2014 and four sitting councillors stood down at the election from Castle, Denton Holme, Harraby and Wetheral wards.

Election result
Labour gained one seat from the Liberal Democrats to win 9 of the 17 seats contested. The Labour gain came in Castle ward and took Labour to 29 councillors, while the Liberal Democrats dropped to 2 seats on the council after failing to win any seats in 2014. The Conservatives also gained a seat in Dalston from independent Bryan Craig and thus won 7 seats in 2014 to have 19 councillors overall. There did remain two independent councillors however, as independent Rob Betton retained his seat in Botcherby. Meanwhile, the UK Independence Party failed to win any seats, but did come second in 10 of the 17 seats contested. Overall turnout at the election was 34.2%.

Ward results

By-elections between 2014 and 2015
A by-election was held in Castle ward on 11 September 2014 after the death of Labour councillor Willie Whalen. The seat was held for Labour by Alan Taylor with a 152-vote majority over Conservative Robert Currie.

References

2014 English local elections
2014
2010s in Cumbria